Chris Broadfoot is an Australian footballer.

Biography
A journeyman striker, he has played for numerous Gold Coast Premier League clubs, with a notable spell with Broadbeach United. He signed for Gold Coast United for the 2010 season.

Honours

Broadbeach United 

 Gold Coast Premier League Premiers: 1999

Burleigh Heads Bulldogs 

 Gold Coast Premier League Champions: 2003

Individual 

 Gold Coast Premier League Golden Boot: 1999, 2003

References

Living people
Gold Coast United FC players
A-League Men players
Australian soccer players
1981 births

Association football forwards